Events from the year 1756 in Ireland.

Incumbent
Monarch: George II

Events
30 May – the Roman Catholic Diocese of Ardagh and Clonmacnoise is formed by merger of the Bishopric of Ardagh with that of Clonmacnoise. Augustine Cheevers serves as first bishop until August when he is succeeded by Anthony Blake.
The title Earl of Lanesborough is created in the Peerage of Ireland in favour of Humphrey Butler, 2nd Viscount Lanesborough.
The title Earl of Shannon is created in the Peerage of Ireland in favour of the politician Henry Boyle.
Charles Bingham was appointed High Sheriff of Mayo

Arts and literature
May – the dramatic poem Leucothoé becomes Isaac Bickerstaffe's first published work.

Births
29 January – Richard Hely-Hutchinson, 1st Earl of Donoughmore, politician (died 1825)
30 June – Charles FitzGerald, 1st Baron Lecale, politician (died 1810)
July – John Hamilton, 1st Marquess of Abercorn, politician (died 1818)
25 July (probable date) – Elizabeth Hamilton, Scottish essayist, poet, satirist and novelist (died 1816 in England)

Deaths
Approximate date – Cathal Buí Mac Giolla Ghunna, poet (born c.1680)

References

 
Years of the 18th century in Ireland
Ireland
1750s in Ireland